I Love Toys is a miniseries on VH1 and the eighth installment of the I Love the... series that premiered on March 6, 2006.  It is a countdown of the 100 greatest toys, chosen partially through public voting on vh1.com and also consideration of "sales, historical significance and longevity," according to VH1.

Each day for 5 days, they would count down from 100 to 1, which is 20 toys per episode. Parts 1-4 were each one hour long, while Part 5 was a special 90-minute edition aired on March 10, 2006. As with the other nostalgia series, the program included commentary by various entertainers, including several who had appeared in most or all of the other shows, such as actor Michael Ian Black, comedian/actress Rachael Harris, Scientologist comedian Evan Wecksell and writer/satirist Mo Rocca.

Hasbro, Inc., turned the selection of a large number of its toys into a press release promoting the company.

Commentators

Carlos Alazraqui
Ant
Julissa Bermudez
Michael Ian Black
Chris Booker
Bow Wow Wow
Amanda Bynes
The Click Five
Jeff Cohen
Rachael Leigh Cook
Fred Coury
Sunda Croonquist
Molly Culver
The Donnas (Brett Anderson and Maya Ford)
Bil Dwyer
Hallie Eisenberg
Emme
Greg Fitzsimmons
Jake Fogelnest
Drew Fraser
Doug E. Fresh
Godfrey
Elon Gold
Douglas Goldstein
Genevieve Gorder
Gilbert Gottfried
Pete Gray
Luis Guzman
Rachael Harris
Mark Hoppus
Scott Ian
Wendy Kaufman
Jo Koy
Ben Lee
Rex Lee
Lisa Lisa
Beth Littleford
Joe Lorge
Loni Love
Kathleen Madigan
Mike Marino
Biz Markie
Ricky Martin
Debbie Matenopoulos
Darryl McDaniels
Andy Macdonald
Billy Merritt
Daryl Mitchell
Kel Mitchell
Modern Humorist (Michael Colton and John Aboud)
Billy Morrison
Jason Mraz
Gunnar Nelson
Patrice O'Neal
Mat Plendl
Megyn Price
Rachel Quaintance
Efren Ramirez
Mo Rocca
Tom Root
Darius Rucker
Stuart Scott
Brad Sherwood
Hal Sparks
Joel Stein
French Stewart
Michael Strahan
Erik Per Sullivan
Jeff Sutphen
Misti Traya
Alanna Ubach
Frank Vincent
Evan Wecksell
Lauren Weedman
Billy West
Jill Whelan
Wil Wheaton
Chris Wylde
Ying Yang Twins

Recurring segments
 Evel Knievel's Amazing Toy Stunts: Evel Knievel action figure attempts jump over random objects and crashes into them.
 Scary Toys: Toys that scare people.
 Cobra Commander's Day Off: Hal Sparks, dressed as a life-size version of action figure villain Cobra Commander, spends his time playing mildly annoying practical jokes on others.
 Supermarket Surprise!: Small prizes found in corner store gum ball vending machines.
 Rank Update: Mo Rocca recaps the toys from each episode.
 Grow a...?: Toys that grow when you put them in water.
 Big in Japan: Voltron and Hello Kitty present toys popular in Japan, but less so in the United States.
 Spoofs of VH1 Shows: VH1 spoofs its own television shows, using toys.
 Real Etch a Sketch Masterpieces: Masterpieces that are drawn on an Etch a Sketch.
 Lego Extreme Challenge: An artist creates an "I Love Toys" logo, using Lego.
 During the credits of every episode, a clip from a popular music video was played without any type of commentary. These were usually replaced with a show promo by VH1.

The Toys

Part 1: 100-81
 100: Magic 8-Ball
 99: Thumbelina doll
 98: BB guns
 97: Spirograph
 96: Pong
 95: Chutes and Ladders
 94: Laser Tag
 93: Sea Monkeys
 92: Dominoes
 91: Uno
 90: Models
 89: Dungeons & Dragons
 88: Care Bears
 87: Radio Control Cars
 86: Ouija Board
 85: My Little Pony
 84: Gumby
 83: Memory
 82: Little Golden Books
 81: Wooly Willy

Evel Knievel's Amazing Toy Stunts: Evel Knievel jumps Barrel O' Monkeys

Scary Toys: Cymbal-banging monkey toy

Cobra Commander's Day Off: 9:17AM - Steal Morning Paper; 10:30AM - Defile Hal Sparks

Supermarket Surprise: Super Ball

Rank Update: Sea Monkeys, Uno, Models and Pong

Grow a...?: Caterpillar

Big in Japan: Astro Boy

Spoofs of VH1 Shows: Driven and Where Are They Now?

Part 2: 80-61
 80: Baby Alive
 79: Trivial Pursuit
 78: Green Army Men
 77: Stickers
 76: Balsa Wood Airplanes
 75: Weebles 
 74: Erector Set
 73: Rainbow Brite
 72: Colorforms
 71: Walkie-Talkies
 70: Candy Land
 69: Slip 'n Slide
 68: Smurfs
 67: Tinkertoys
 66: Risk
 65: Jigsaw Puzzles 
 64: Roller Skates
 63: Rubik's Cube
 62: Life
 61: Operation

Evel Knievel's Amazing Toy Stunts: Evel Knievel jumps Imperial Walker

Scary Toys: Jack-in-the-box

Cobra Commander's Day Off: 11:15AM - Cheat at Chess; 11:47AM - Gas DMV

Supermarket Surprise: Ring

Rank Update: Green Army Men, Baby Alive and Balsa Wood Airplanes

Grow a...?: Alligator

Big in Japan: My Melody

Spoofs of VH1 Shows: Storytellers and Behind the Music

Part 3: 60-41
 60: Tickle Me Elmo
 59: Simon
 58: Mad Libs
 57: Stretch Armstrong
 56: Barrel O' Monkeys
 55: Mouse Trap
 54: View-Master
 53: He-Man
 52: Speak & Spell
 51: Lincoln Logs
 50: Game Boy
 49: Clue
 48: Little People
 47: Evel Knievel Stunt Cycle
 46: Hungry Hungry Hippos
 45: Frisbee
 44: Raggedy Ann and Andy
 43: See 'n Say
 42: Jump rope
 41: Transformers

Evel Knievel's Amazing Toy Stunts: Evel Knievel jumps a globe

Scary Toys: Great Garloo

Cobra Commander's Day Off: 12:20PM - Rip Off Tourists; 12:27PM - Oppress Minority

Supermarket Surprise: Helmet

Rank Update: Mouse Trap, View-Master, Game Boy and He-Man

Grow a...?: Butterfly

Big in Japan: Godzilla

Spoofs of VH1 Shows: VH1 All Access: Awesomely Bad Fashion and The Surreal Life

Part 4: 40-21
 40: Big Wheel
 39: Tea Set
 38: Pogo Stick
 37: Mattel Classic Football
 36: Strawberry Shortcake
 35: Tonka Trucks
 34: Connect Four
 33: Teenage Mutant Ninja Turtles
 32: Shrinky Dinks
 31: Twister
 30: Battleship
 29: Cabbage Patch Kids
 28: Crayola Crayons
 27: Silly Putty
 26: Lionel Trains
 25: Lite-Brite
 24: Water guns
 23: Nerf
 22: Teddy bears
 21: Nintendo

Evel Knievel's Amazing Toy Stunts: Evel Knievel jumps Sheriff Dillo

Scary Toys: Perfection

Cobra Commander's Day Off: 3:25PM - Ruin Workspace; 5:01PM - Terminate Connection

Supermarket Surprise: Homie

Rank Update: Pogo Stick, Tonka Trucks, Twister and Strawberry Shortcake

Grow a...?: Princess

Big in Japan: Afro Samurai

Spoofs of VH1 Shows: Before They Were Rock Stars and I Love the '80s

Part 5: 20-1
 20: Atari
 19: Easy-Bake Oven
 18: Scrabble
 17: Rock 'Em Sock 'Em Robots
 16:  Etch A Sketch
 15: Matchbox and Hot Wheels cars
 14: Bicycles 
 13: Snoopy Sno-Cone Machine
 12: Radio Flyer wagon
 11: Play-Doh
 10: Wiffle Bat and Ball
 9: Slinky
 8: Yo-yo
 7: Star Wars Action Figures
 6: Monopoly
 5: Mr. Potato Head
 4: G.I. Joe
 3: Lego
 2: Barbie
 1: Hula hoop

Evel Knievel's Amazing Toy Stunts: Evel Knievel jumps spaghetti and meatballs

Scary Toys: Saucy Walker doll

Cobra Commander's Day Off: 1:15PM - Piss Off Chrome Dome; Sabotage Men's Room

Supermarket Surprise: Paratrooper

Rank Update: Atari, Bicycles, Snoopy Sno-Cone Machine, Play-Doh and Easy-Bake Oven

Grow a...?: Lizard

Big in Japan: Business Man

Spoofs of VH1 Shows: The Fabulous Life of... and Celebrity Fit Club

Real Etch-a-Sketch Masterpieces: Andy Warhol, Albert Einstein and Jay Leno

LEGO Extreme Challenge: 1,768 Bricks, 8 Colors and 7 Hours

References

External links

VH1 original programming
Television shows based on toys
2000s American television miniseries
2006 American television series debuts
2006 American television series endings